Avondale is an unincorporated community in Bibb County, Georgia, United States. It is part of the Macon Metropolitan Statistical Area.

History
The community's name is an allusion to the River Avon, in England.

References

Unincorporated communities in Georgia (U.S. state)
Unincorporated communities in Bibb County, Georgia
Macon metropolitan area, Georgia